The 1868 Grand National was the 30th renewal of the Grand National horse race that took place at Aintree near Liverpool, England, on 4 March 1868.

Finishing Order

Non-finishers

References

 1868
Grand National
Grand National
19th century in Lancashire
March 1868 sports events